Stanton-by-Dale Cricket Club is an amateur cricket club based in Stanton-by-Dale, Derbyshire, England and the club has a history dating back to the mid 19th century.

Ground
Stanton-by-Dale CC is located south of the village on Crompton Ground, Stanton-by-Dale, Derbyshire, described as compact and flat and is rated by the DCCL as a Grade A ground.

History
The earliest known record of cricket associated with the village of Stanton-by-Dale is a reference in the Nottingham Review, dated 27 October 1848, reporting a match between "the pasrishes of Sandiacre and Stanton-by-Dale". The ground is situated south of the village, at the end of School Lane on a field called Crompton Ground. The current 'D.S. King pavilion' (built in 1985) replaced an old RAF Hut constructed in 1961, which in turn replaced their original wooden pavilion which stood on the ground since its construction in 1899. Detail on the early years of the club can be sourced from a history of the club by Harold Walker, in "Echoes of Stanton", 1951.

After almost 30 years playing friendlies, the club joined the then 'Central Derbyshire League' in 1974, followed by 20 years of competitive cricket over the county boundary with the South Nottinghamshire Cricket League (1992-2012) before joining the Derbyshire County Cricket League in 2013.

The Club currently has 2 senior teams competing in the Derbyshire County Cricket League.

Club performance
The Derbyshire County Cricket League competition results showing the club's positions in the league (by Division) since 2013.

The South Nottinghamshire Cricket League competition results showing the club's position (by Division) between 2005-2012.

Club honours

 Derbyshire County Cricket League: Division 7 (South) Champions, 2017

Events on film
 Cricketing memories of Stanton by Dale Cricket Club with Richard Deeley, Robert Ellen and Dave Alton.
 Stanton-by-Dale Cricket Club Part 1
 Stanton-by-Dale Cricket Club Part 2
 Stanton-by-Dale Cricket Club Part 3

See also
Club cricket

References

External links
 
 The Club Play-Cricket website
 Derbyshire County Cricket League Official Play-Cricket website

English club cricket teams
Cricket in Derbyshire
1848 establishments in England
Club cricket